A dolos (plural: dolosse) is a wave-dissipating concrete block  used in great numbers as a form of coastal management. It is a type of tetrapod. The dolos was invented in 1963, and was first deployed in 1964 on the breakwater of East London, a South African port city.

Construction
 
Dolosse are normally made from un-reinforced concrete, poured into a steel mould. The concrete will sometimes be mixed with small steel fibers to strengthen it in the absence of reinforcement.

They are used to protect harbour walls, breakwaters and shore earthworks. In Dania Beach, Florida, dolosse are used as an artificial reef known as the Dania Beach Erojacks. They are also used to trap sea-sand to prevent erosion.  An order of 10,000 dolosse are required for a kilometre of coastline.

They work by dissipating, rather than blocking, the energy of waves.  Their design deflects most wave action energy to the side, making them more difficult to dislodge than objects of a similar weight presenting a flat surface. Though they are placed into position on top of each other by cranes, over time they tend to get further entangled as the waves shift them. Their design ensures that they form an interlocking but porous and slightly flexible wall.

The individual units are often numbered so that their movements can be tracked. This helps engineers gauge whether they need to add more dolosse to the pile.

Dolosse are also being used in rivers in the Pacific Northwest of the United States of America, to control erosion, prevent channel migration and to create and restore salmon habitat. Examples are engineered log jams, or ELJs, that may aid in efforts to save stocks of salmon.  Local, county, state, federal and private industry experts in engineering design, fluvial geomorphology and fisheries conservation are working together to protect important public infrastructure such as roads and commercial and residential developments, while maintaining, improving, restoring, or creating aquatic habitat.  The sheer mass of the dolosse provides ballast for logs and slash ("wrack" or "rack" organic debris) to create a stable, complex habitat structure, all the while precluding the need for excessive, environmentally-invasive and costly excavation for their placement into substrate. Such ELJs represent an innovative design aiding the recovery of Pacific Northwest (particularly Endangered Species Act-listed) salmonids, while protecting important public and private works and thus helping to balance the needs of man and nature.

Credit for invention
The design of the dolos is usually credited to the South African Eric Mowbray Merrifield, one-time East London Harbour Engineer (from 1961–1976). In the late 1990s the claim of Aubrey Kruger gained more prominence. Kruger's claim is that he and Merrifield had considered the shape of concrete blocks to be used to protect East London's extensive breakwaters for the City's non-natural harbour, following a major storm in 1963. Merrifield wished to design a block that did not break up or shift when struck by the sea; that was cheap; and that did not require precise placement.  He said in later years that he wanted a block designed in such a way that it could be "sprinkled like children's jacks". Kruger stated that he went home for lunch, cut three sections from a broomstick, and fastened them with nails into an H-shape with one leg turned through 90 degrees to create the distinctive dolos shape.  Merrifield was intrigued by the object and had Kruger draw a plan. Kruger never formally received credit for the invention.  Merrifield won the Shell Design Award and the Associated Science and Technology Societies of South Africa's Gold Medal. The death of Merrifield (in 1982) has put this controversy beyond proof either way.
Aubrey Kruger died in East London on 19 July 2016.

Design protection
The design of the dolos is not protected by any form of patent. Merrifield did not take the necessary steps to protect the concept.

The reason for this is uncertain. Two reasons for this have been put forward: one by Merrifield; the other by Kruger.  Merrifield stated that he did not protect them as he wished them to benefit humanity. Kruger alleges that Merrifield received incorrect legal advice: to wit, that as the blocks had been designed during office hours while he was employed by the State (South African Railways and Harbours Administration), he was unable by law to protect their design.

Origin of name
 The name is derived from the Afrikaans word dolos- plural dolosse. This word has two given derivations.   states it to be a contraction of 'dobbel osse', or 'gambling' (Afrikaans) 'bones' (from Latin). Boshof and Nienaber state it to be a contraction of 'dollen os', or 'play' (old Dutch) 'oxen' (Afrikaans).  The first is a meaning-shifted reference to ox knuckle-joint bones used in divination practices by sangomas, Southern African traditional healers.  They somewhat resemble these bones. The second is a reference to ox or lamb knuckle bones used by African children at play.

The name was attached to the objects when Kruger's father, Joe Kruger, who also worked in the harbour, came upon his son and others playing with small models of the objects and asked him Wat speel julle met die dolos? (English: What are you playing at with the dolos?). There is a very ancient game called knucklebones, a modern version of which uses playing pieces as shown in the adjacent photograph. The similarity between these and dolos is beyond question.

See also 

  – jetties were reinforced using dolosse in the 1980s maintaining the entrance at one of the world's most treacherous harbor entrances

Notes and references

Eastern Cape Dispatch, 28 June 1999
Martin Creamer's Engineering News, 16 February 2001
South African Financial Mail, 3 December 2004

External links
 POSIBLOC™ system for placement aid of concrete blocks

Civil engineering
Coastal construction
Coastal engineering
Wave-dissipating concrete blocks
South African inventions